Coco Vandeweghe was the defending champion, but lost in the quarterfinals to Kiki Bertens.

Fifth-seeded Camila Giorgi won her first WTA title, defeating Belinda Bencic in the final, 7–5 6–3.

Seeds

Draw

Finals

Top half

Bottom half

Qualifying

Seeds

Qualifiers

Draw

First qualifier

Second qualifier

Third qualifier

Fourth qualifier

References
 Main draw
 Qualifying draw

Topshelf Openandnbsp;- Singles
2015 Women's Singles